Sharon Geary is an American swimmer, gold winner at the Pan American Games.

She competed at the 1951 Pan American Games in Buenos Aires, where she received a gold medal in 100 m freestyle, before Jacqueline Lavine and Ana María Schultz. She participated on the American teams that received gold medals in 4x100 freestyle relay, and 4x100m medley relay at the 1951 Pan American Games.

Geary attended Stanford University and is a member of the Stanford Athletic Hall of Fame.

References

Year of birth missing (living people)
Living people
American female freestyle swimmers
Stanford University alumni
Swimmers at the 1951 Pan American Games
Pan American Games gold medalists for the United States
Pan American Games medalists in swimming
Medalists at the 1951 Pan American Games
21st-century American women
20th-century American women